A by-election for the constituency of Howdenshire in the United Kingdom House of Commons was held on 27 November 1947, caused by the retirement of the incumbent Conservative MP Clifford Glossop. The result was a hold for the Conservative Party, with their candidate George Odey.

Result

Previous election

References

 Craig, F. W. S. (1983) [1969]. British parliamentary election results 1918-1949 (3rd edition ed.). Chichester: Parliamentary Research Services. . 
 

By-elections to the Parliament of the United Kingdom in Yorkshire and the Humber constituencies
Howdenshire by-election
Howdenshire by-election 
Elections in the East Riding of Yorkshire
Howdenshire by-election, 1947
Howdenshire by-election